Anna Elizabeth Klumpke (October 28, 1856 – February 9, 1942) was an American portrait and genre painter born in San Francisco, California, United States. She is perhaps best known for her portraits of famous women including Elizabeth Cady Stanton (1889) and Rosa Bonheur (1898).

Early life and education

Anna's father, John Gerald Klumpke, born in England or Germany, was a successful and wealthy realtor in San Francisco. Her mother was Dorothea Mattilda Tolle. Anna was the eldest of eight children, five of whom lived to maturity. Among her siblings were the astronomer Dorothea Klumpke-Roberts, the violinist Julia Klumpke, and the neurologist Augusta Déjerine-Klumpke.

At age three, Anna fell and suffered a fracture of her femur. She fell again at age five and suffered osteomyelitis with purulent knee arthritis. These problems left her with a disability, and her mother went to extraordinary lengths to find a remedy by taking Anna and three of her siblings to Berlin for treatment by Dr. Bernhard von Langenbeck. The treatment lasted 18 months and included thermal baths at Kreuznach. Unfortunately, it was not successful, and Anna would always have difficulty walking. While they were in Europe, her mother ensured that her children received excellent tutoring. The time away in Europe strained the Klumpkes' relationship. When Anna was fifteen, her parents divorced. She and her siblings (now numbering five) moved with their mother to Göttingen, Germany, where they lived for a time with Mattilda's sister, who had married a German national. Anna and her sister Augusta were sent to school at Cannstatt, near Stuttgart. When she was seventeen, the family moved to Clarens, near Lake Geneva in Switzerland where she spent two years in a boarding school.

Anna studied art at home for the next few years, and in October 1877, moved with her family once more to Paris, where she was later enrolled in the Académie Julian (1883–1884), under the tutelage of Tony Robert-Fleury and Jules Lefebvre. She spent many an hour copying paintings in the Musée du Luxembourg, including Rosa Bonheur's Ploughing in the Nivernais. At one point, she also studied under Vuillefroy. She presented her first work at the Paris Salon in 1884, while still at the Academy, and she won the grand prize for outstanding student of the year. She exhibited regularly at the Salon for several more years. After completing her studies, she returned to the United States for a few years and taught in Boston. However, by 1889, she was back in Paris.

Career

Klumpke and Bonheur 
As a girl, Anna had been given a "Rosa" doll, styled after the French animal painter Rosa Bonheur—so famous at the time that dolls were made in her image. From early childhood, Anna had been fascinated and inspired by the woman artist.

In 1895, the two women met, Bonheur at age 73 and Klumpke at age 39. Klumpke was intent on painting Bonheur's portrait.

By August 11, 1898, the two women were living together and had signed a contract, Bonheur created a new art studio for Klumpke and in exchange Klumpke would paint three portraits of Bonheur and write her biography. Their relationship endured until Bonheur's death in May 1899.

Klumpke was named as the sole heir to Bonheur's estate, against the family's desire. In 1899, she opened the Rosa Bonheur Memorial Art School, providing art education for women. She oversaw the sale of Bonheur's collected works in 1900. She founded the Rosa Bonheur Prize at the Société des Artistes Français and organized the Musée de l'atelier Rosa Bonheur (Museum of the Studio of Rosa Bonheur) at Château de By near the Palace of Fontainebleau.

Klumpke was a meticulous diarist, publishing in 1908 a biography of Bonheur, Sa Vie Son Oeuvre, meaning Her Life, Her Work. This biography was based on her own diary and Bonheur's letters, sketches and other writings. In the book, which was not published in English until 1998, Klumpke told the story of Bonheur's life and related how she had met Bonheur, how they had fallen in love, and how she had become the artist's official portraitist and companion.

Klumpke exhibited her work at the Palace of Fine Arts and The Woman's Building at the 1893 World's Columbian Exposition in Chicago, Illinois.

San Francisco 
Following Bonheur's death, Klumpke divided her time between France, Boston, and San Francisco, finally settling in San Francisco in the 1930s. During World War I, with her mother, she established a military convalescent hospital at her home in Thomery.

In 1940, at the age of 84, Klumpke published her own autobiography Memoirs of an Artist. She died on February 9, 1942, at the age of 86 years in her native San Francisco. A memorial to her is at Neptune Society Columbarium, San Francisco, and she is buried alongside Rosa Bonheur and Nathalie Micas at Père Lachaise Cemetery, Paris. Their collective tomb reads "Friendship is divine affection". Klumpke was included in the 2018 exhibit Women in Paris 1850–1900.

Style
Anna Klumpke was primarily a genre painter, often painting pastoral scenes featuring static figures, usually female. Her painting, Catinou Knitting, was exhibited at the Paris Salon in 1887. This sentimental image proved highly popular in reproduction and is still sold in hand-painted copies. She also painted portraits, many of which were women.

Awards and honors
 1885 – honorable mention, Paris Salon
 1888 – first prize, Académie Julian, Paris, France
 1889 – Temple Gold Medal, for the painting In the Wash-House, Pennsylvania Academy of the Fine Arts. She was the first woman ever to receive this award.
 1919 – Silver medal (médaille d'argent de la Reconnaissance française), Medal of French Gratitude (La Reconnaissance Française), awarded by Anna and her mother by the government of France in relation to her sister Augusta and her brother in law Jules' contributions to France during WWI.
 1924 – Chevalier of the Légion d’honneur, France
 1936 – Officier of the Légion d’honneur, awarded for her eight years of membership, France

Bibliography

Autobiography

Other publications by Klumpke 
  – The first edition of this book was leather-bound and illustrated with seven heliogravure plates, 200 photographic plates of Bonheur's paintings and bound by the Hicks-Judd Bindery of San Francisco.

Notable works

References

Further reading

External links 

  at San Francisco Columbarium

1856 births
1942 deaths
American portrait painters
American women painters
American genre painters
Artists from San Francisco
Recipients of the Legion of Honour
Use mdy dates from August 2011
Académie Julian alumni
American expatriates in France
Painters from California
19th-century American painters
20th-century American painters
20th-century American women artists
19th-century American women artists
American lesbian artists